Arturo Castiglioni (10 April 1874, Trieste – 21 January 1953, Milano) was an Austro-Hungarian Empire-born American medical historian and university professor.

Biography
Castiglioni grew up in Trieste, Austro-Hungrian Empire. In 1939, he emigrated to the States and became a professor at Yale University in New Haven, Connecticut. His brother was Camillo Castiglioni, an Italian-Austrian banker. Castiglioni was a member of the International Society for the History of Medicine.

Literary works
 Il volto di Ippocrate, 1925
 Storia della medicina, 1927
 Italian medicine, 1932
 The history of tuberculosis, 1933
 The renaissance of medicine in Italy, 1934
 Incantesimo e magia, 1934
 L'orto della sanita, 1935

Bibliography

 John Farquhar Fulton, "Arturo Castiglioni 1874-1953", Journal of the History of Medicine and Allied Sciences, 1953, vol. 8, n. 2, pp. 129–132

References

External links
 

Italian medical historians
Austro-Hungarian emigrants to the United States
American medical historians
1874 births
1952 deaths